Vésteinn Hafsteinsson (born 12 December 1960) is a retired discus thrower from Iceland. He was born in Selfoss, and represented his native country at four consecutive Summer Olympics, starting in 1984. His personal best is 67.64 metres, thrown on May 31, 1989 in Selfoss. Vésteinn competed in five consecutive World Championships, starting in 1983, but never reached the final. He previously coached World and Olympic champion Gerd Kanter and Olympic silver medalist Joachim B. Olsen and is currently coaching Daniel Ståhl and Simon Pettersson the gold and silver medalists at the Tokyo Olympics.

Achievements

External links
 Personal website

References
IAAF Profile

1960 births
Living people
Vesteinn Hafsteinsson
Athletes (track and field) at the 1984 Summer Olympics
Athletes (track and field) at the 1988 Summer Olympics
Athletes (track and field) at the 1992 Summer Olympics
Athletes (track and field) at the 1996 Summer Olympics
Doping cases in athletics
Vesteinn Hafsteinsson
Vesteinn Hafsteinsson
Recipients of the Order of the Cross of Terra Mariana, 4th Class
People from Selfoss